Gail Denenberg Toushin (born January 17, 1947) is an American professional golfer who played on the LPGA Tour.

Denenberg won once on the LPGA Tour in 1974.

Professional wins (1)

LPGA Tour wins (1)

References

American female golfers
LPGA Tour golfers
Golfers from New York (state)
University of Miami alumni
Sportspeople from New York City
1947 births
Living people
21st-century American women